Eobelemnites is a genus of belemnite from the Mississippian Epoch.

See also

 List of belemnites

References

Belemnites
Carboniferous cephalopods